was a Japanese actor, who made notable appearances in the films of Akira Kurosawa and Yasujirō Ozu in the 1950s and 1960s. Perhaps his most famous roles in the West were those of the callous deputy mayor in Kurosawa's Ikiru (1952), and the hairdresser's henpecked husband in Ozu's Tokyo Story (1953).

Nakamura was also famous for many notable contributions to Japanese modern theatre. In 1937, he founded the Bungakuza company along with Haruko Sugimura, Seiji Miyaguchi, and Masayuki Mori. Nakamura played Polonius in Hamlet, Herod in Wilde's Salome, Aleksandr Vladimirovich Serebryakov in Chekov's Uncle Vanya, and Krapp in Krapp's Last Tape. He also appeared in Macbeth, The Merchant of Venice, and The Cherry Orchard . In the 1950s and 1960s, he played major roles in Yukio Mishima's plays such as Rokumeikan, My Friend Hitler, and so on. In 1963, Nakamura left Bungakuza company and founded the NLT company with Mishima. His most famous and successful role is considered to be The Professor in Ionesco's The Lesson. He performed The Lesson for the first time in 1972 and played The Professor every Friday night at Shibuya Jean-Jean, a small theatre in Shibuya, Tokyo until 1983. Appropriately, one of his last movie roles was a cameo as a deceptively decrepit-looking "professor" in Juzo Itami's film comedy Tampopo (1985).

Selected filmography

Films

1938: Hanataba no yume
1942: Haha no chizu - Hideo
1946: Urashima Tarô no kôei
1951: Jiyû gakkô
1952: Honjitsu kyûshin - Take-san
1952: To Live - Deputy Mayor
1953: Zoku Jûdai no seiten - Tateuo Ueda
1953: Aoiro kakumei - Professor Hisamatsu
1953: Senkan Yamato
1953: Tokyo Story - Kurazo Kaneko
1953: An Inlet of Muddy Water - Yasubee (Story 2)
1954: Itsuko to sono haha - Nomura, Chairman
1954: Tomoshibi - Keizo Kawamura
1955: Jû jin yuki otoko - Professor Koizumi
1955: Shichinin no ani imôto - Yukichi Kitahara
1955: I Live in Fear - Psychologist
1956: Early Spring - Arakawa, chief executive
1956: Yûyake-gumo - Seiji's father, Haruo
1956: Shiroi magyo
1956: Gendai no yokubô - Takamatsu
1956: Shokei no heya - Professor
1956: Onibi
1956: Konyaku yubiwa-engeeji ringu
1956: Flowing
1956: Hibana - Takayama
1957: Throne of Blood - Phantom samurai
1957: Tokyo Twilight - Sakae Aiba
1957: Hikage no musume
1957: Yoru no chô - Customer
1957: Sono yoru no himegoto - Ryusaku Endo
1957: Nichiro sensô shôri no hishi: Tekichû ôdan sanbyaku-ri
1958: Rickshaw Man - Yoshiko's brother
1958: Anzukko
1958: Hana no bojô - Kaô Hishikawa
1958: Equinox Flower - Toshihiko Kawai
1958: Akujo no kisetsu - Dr. Mizutani
1958: Haru kôrô no hana no en - Shuntarô Tanaka
1958: Half Human - Prof. Tanaka (uncredited)
1959: The Human Condition - Honsha Buchô
1959: Onna gokoro - Tsujinoto
1959: Hanran - Kuga
1959: Yajû shisubeshi - Professor Sugimura
1959: Anyakôro - Kensaku's father
1959: Kaoyaku to bakudan musume - Kôda
1960: Kuroi gashû: Aru sarariman no shôgen
1960: Bokutô kitan - Sanji
1960: The Bad Sleep Well - Legal Adviser
1960: A False Student - Takagi
1960: Late Autumn - Shuzo Taguchi
1960: Oden jigoku - Masabumi Gotô
1961: Midaregami - Wataru Kamogawa
1961: Tôkyô yawa - Kyosuke Kamiko
1961: As a Wife, As a Woman - Kimura
1961: The Last War
1961: Machi - Public prosecutor
1961: Onna no tsurihashi - Shinkichi Haurno (Episode 2)
1961: Okoto to Sasuke
1962: Sono yo wa wasurenai - Taneda
1962: An Autumn Afternoon - Shuzo Kawai
1963: High and Low - Ishimaru, National Shoes Design Department Director
1964: Zoku shachô shinshiroku
1964: Geisha gakkô
1964: Hadaka no jûyaku - Serizawa, executive
1964: Dogara, the Space Monster - Dr. Munakata - Dr. Munakata
1964: Mesu - Eitaro Shudo
1965: Daikon to ninjin
1965: Frankenstein Conquers the World - Skeptical Museum Chief
1965: Honkon no shiroibara - Nagahara
1966: Zoku shachô gyôjôki
1966: Fukuzatsu na kare
1966: The War of the Gargantuas - Dr. Kita
1966: Thirst for Love - Yakichi Sugimoto
1967: Japan's Longest Day - Kōichi Kido
1967: Sodachi zakari - Shingo Nakayu
1967: Two in the Shadow
1968: Shachô hanjôki
1968: Zoku shacho hanjôki
1968: Rio no wakadaishô
1968: Suna no kaori - Chief Judge
1969: Futari no koibito - Ryôhei Kôno
1970: Jaga wa hashitta - Head of N-Bussan
1970: The Militarists - Kōichi Kido (uncredited)
1971: Maboroshi no satsui
1972: Kuro no honryu - Daizo Kitagawa
1973: Tidal Wave - Japanese Ambassador to Australia
1973: Kôkotsu no hito - Fujieda, lawyer
1974: Karei-naru ichizoku - Matsudaira
1975: Zesshô
1976: Shunkinsho - Harumatsu
1977: Akuma no temari-uta- Hôan Tatara
1985: Tampopo - Intended victim of con man
1987: Bu su - Customer
1991: No raifu kingu - (final film role)

Television
1969: Ten to Chi to - Amari Torayasu
1972: Shin Heike Monogatari - Toba Sōjō
1978: Shiroi Kyotō - Professor Azuma

Honours
Medal with Purple Ribbon (1976)

References

External links
 

1908 births
1991 deaths
Japanese male film actors
20th-century Japanese male actors
People from Otaru
Recipients of the Medal with Purple Ribbon